Legacy High School is a high school located in Broomfield, Colorado  that opened in 2000. It is within the Adams 12 Five Star Schools District. The school had 2,406 students for the 2018/2019 school year.

Academic programs
The school offers Advanced Placement classes. Additionally, the school offers the Legacy 2000 program to students interested in STEM fields. The four year program prepares students for college and a career by enhancing writing, public speaking, problem solving, and engineering project skills.

Incidents
In 2016, a school bus carrying the Legacy High School football team crashed into a concrete support near the terminal while driving from Denver International Airport, killing the bus driver and injuring multiple students.

Athletics
Legacy sports, except football, participate in the 5A division of the Colorado High School Activities Association, in the Front Range League.  Football is the only Legacy sport that does not participate in the 5A Front Range League, but instead participates in the 5A North Metro League,.

Legacy offers boys' and girls' cross country, football, boys' golf, girls' gymnastics, girls' Cheerleading, boys' soccer, softball, boys' tennis, volleyball, boys' and girls' basketball, girls' swimming, wrestling, baseball, girls' golf, girls' soccer, boys' swimming, girls' tennis, and boys' and girls' track and field.

Softball
The Legacy softball program was the 2007, 2008, 2009, 2010, 2011, and 2013 state champions.

Basketball
The Legacy girls' varsity basketball team won the Colorado 5A State Championship during the 2011-2012 season.

Track and Field
In the 2018 5A State Championship meet, sophomore Brynn Siles finished 2nd in the 3200 meters and 7th in the 1600 meters.

Swimming
Steve Schmuhl won the Colorado 5A State Championships in the 100 and 200 yard freestyles in 2008 and 2009. He set state records in both events.

Arts and Music

Band

The Legacy High School marching band was the CBA State Marching Band champion in 2006, 2007, 2008, 2009, 2010, 2011, 2014, 2015, 2016, 2017, and 2021 for class 5A, tied with Pomona High School for the record of most CBA State Marching Band Championship titles with 11. The Legacy Marching band was the silver medalist for the CBA State Marching Band State Championships in 2012, 2013, 2018, 2019, and 2022. The Legacy Marching Band has been a state finalist every year of competition since the band started competition one year after the school opened.  The band was the 1st place overall marching band in the 2010 Parade of Lights.  The band was invited to travel to London, England in 2009 to perform in the 2010 New Years Day Parade. In 2010, the band was selected to play in the 2011 Macy's Thanksgiving Day Parade. The winter percussion ensemble earned state championships in 2006, 2007, 2009, 2022. The winter guard earned six consecutive state championships from 2004–2009, as well as a silver medal in the 2009 WGI World Championships.

The Legacy Marching Band performed in the 2015 Rose Parade in Pasadena, California on New Year's Day.

In March 2018, the Legacy Marching Band performed in Dublin's St. Patrick's Day Festival and was awarded 'Best Overall Band', beating out over ten other competing bands.

Notable alumni

Nick Kasa, former American football tight end who played for the Oakland Raiders and Denver Broncos of the National Football League (NFL)
Steve Schmuhl, American competitive swimmer who competes in medley events, and was a member of the 2012 FINA World Swimming Championships (25 m) team and the 2010 Summer Youth Olympic Games team.
Tajon Buchanan, Canadian professional soccer player who plays as a winger for Belgian First Division A side Club Brugge KV and the Canada men's national soccer team.
Lucas Gilbreath, American professional baseball pitcher for the Colorado Rockies of Major League Baseball (MLB).

References

External links
 
   Adams 12 School District website

Public high schools in Colorado
Schools in Broomfield, Colorado
Educational institutions established in 2000
2000 establishments in Colorado